Melissa Sue Anderson (born September 26, 1962) is an American-Canadian actress. She began her career as a child actress after appearing in several commercials in Los Angeles. Anderson is known for her role as Mary Ingalls in the NBC drama series Little House on the Prairie (1974–1983), for which she received a nomination for the Primetime Emmy Award for Outstanding Lead Actress in a Drama Series.

She is also known for film roles that include Vivian in Midnight Offerings (1981), Ginny in the slasher film Happy Birthday to Me (1981), and Alex in the ABC Afterschool Special, Which Mother Is Mine? (1979).

Anderson became a naturalized citizen of Canada in 2007. In 2010, she published The Way I See It: A Look Back at My Life on Little House, an autobiographical account of her years acting in Little House on the Prairie.

Early life
Anderson was born on September 26, 1962, in Berkeley, California, the second of two daughters, to James and Marion Anderson. Her sister, Maureen, is 12 years her senior. When she was seven years old, Anderson's family relocated from the San Francisco Bay Area to Los Angeles. Her parents divorced when she was 13 years old, and she was raised Roman Catholic by her mother. As a young child, Anderson appeared in commercials for Mattel and Sears.

Career
Anderson's show business career began when a dance teacher urged her parents to find an agent for her. After appearing in commercials, she was soon in demand for television roles. Her first came in a 1972 episode of Bewitched titled "Tabitha's First Day of School". Another memorable early role was as Millicent, a girl who kissed Bobby in The Brady Bunch. She also appeared in an episode of Shaft the same year.

At the age of 11, Anderson landed the role of Mary Ingalls in Little House on the Prairie. She would go on to star in the series for eight seasons, beginning in 1974, and leaving after season seven; she later appeared in three episodes of season eight in late 1981.

In 1976, Michael Landon asked Anderson if she would appear in his autobiographical film The Loneliest Runner. Anderson agreed to play Nancy Rizzi, the first girlfriend of John Curtis (based on Landon and played by Lance Kerwin), saying she was very thrilled to have been asked. In 1977, she once again co-starred as the love interest opposite Kerwin in the television film James at 15.

She was nominated for a 1978 Primetime Emmy Award for Best Leading Actress in a Drama Series for her work on Little House on the Prairie and won the Emmy Award for her performance in Which Mother Is Mine?, which aired as an ABC Afterschool Special in 1979. Also in 1979, she played the title role of Dana Lee Gilbert, a North Dakota transfer student to Los Angeles' San Fernando Valley in CBS's television film Survival of Dana.

In 1980, Anderson earned a 'TP de Oro' Award (considered to be Spain's most prestigious award for television) for 'Best Foreign Actress' for her role in Little House on the Prairie. This followed a successful visit to Spain in 1979 to appear as a guest on RTVE's program, 625 Lineas. In 1981, she earned a Young Artist Award nomination for her performance in the Canadian slasher film Happy Birthday to Me. After leaving Little House, she continued acting in television series like The Equalizer, Alfred Hitchcock Presents, CHiPs and Murder, She Wrote, and was the associate producer for the next-to-last television project Michael Landon made before dying: Where Pigeons Go to Die (1990).

In 1998, she was inducted into the Western Performers Hall of Fame at the National Cowboy & Western Heritage Museum in Oklahoma City, Oklahoma. In 1999, she starred alongside Heather Langenkamp in the short-lived television series Partners. In 2014, Anderson had an uncredited appearance as Stosh's mother in the neo-noir mystery comedy drama film Veronica Mars (2014).

Other ventures
In 2010, Anderson released an autobiography titled The Way I See It: A Look Back at My Life on Little House. The book, which is primarily based on her life during her years as a child star in Little House on the Prairie, contains behind-the-scenes stories and anecdotes about the show itself, its stars, guest stars, and crew members. The autobiography also covers her pre- and post-Little House career, her side-projects during the Little House years and how her personal life was affected by her career.

Personal life
Anderson married television writer and producer Michael Sloan (The Hardy Boys/Nancy Drew Mysteries, The Equalizer and others) in 1990. The couple has two children, daughter Piper and son Griffin. The family moved to Montreal in 2002 and became naturalized Canadians on Canada Day in 2007.

Filmography

Television

Film

References

Further reading
 Dye, David. Child and Youth Actors: Filmography of Their Entire Careers, 1914-1985. Jefferson, NC: McFarland & Co., 1988, p. 5-6.

External links

 
 Melissa Sue Anderson interview on YouTube
About Melissa Sue Anderson

1962 births
Living people
20th-century American actresses
21st-century American actresses
Actresses from Berkeley, California
Actresses from Los Angeles
Actresses from Montreal
American child actresses
American emigrants to Canada
American television actresses
Canadian expatriates in the United States
Television producers from California
American women television producers
American voice actresses
Naturalized citizens of Canada
Western (genre) film actresses
American people of Swedish descent